Pascal Karibe Ojigwe (born 11 December 1976) is a Nigerian former professional footballer who played as a defender or defensive midfielder. He also holds German citizenship.

Early life
Ojigwe was born in Aba, Nigeria.Eastern part of Nigerian

Club career

Loan to Köln
Ojigwe went on loan from 1. FC Kaiserslautern to second-tier 1. FC Köln for the 1999–2000 2. Bundesliga season.

Leverkusen
Ojigwe refused to return to his parent club and instead moved to Champions League participant Bayer 04 Leverkusen, for a transfer fee believed to be DM 3.5 million (about €1.75 million) On the occasion of the transfer there had been a huge public argument between then Köln and Leverkusen managers, Johannes Linßen and Reiner Calmund.

Honours
 UEFA Champions League runner-up: 2001–02
 Bundesliga: 1997–98; runner-up: 2001–02
 DFB-Pokal finalist: 2001–02

References

1976 births
Living people
People from Aba, Abia
Association football defenders
Association football midfielders
Nigerian footballers
Nigerian expatriate footballers
Nigeria international footballers
Enyimba F.C. players
1. FC Kaiserslautern players
1. FC Köln players
Bayer 04 Leverkusen players
Borussia Mönchengladbach players
TSV 1860 Munich players
Bundesliga players
2. Bundesliga players
2002 African Cup of Nations players
Expatriate footballers in Germany